Mohun Bagan Athletic Club, is a major Indian professional multi-sport club based in the Kolkata, India. The football team participated in the I-League until the football section merged with ATK in July 2020 to form ATK Mohun Bagan to play in Indian Super League.

Founded in 1889 as Mohun Bagan Sporting Club, is one of the oldest football club in India and Asia. The first professional manager appointed for Mohun Bagan was an ex-Bagan player, Chima Okorie, in January 2007. 3 months later he resigned after some dressing room conflicts.

Under Karim Bencherifa, Mohun Bagan created a record of most consecutive I-League match victories(10) in 2008-09 season. Among the long list of managers, only two could manage Mohun Bagan to win the prestigious I-League, Sanjoy Sen(in 2015) and Kibu Vicuña(in 2020). Under the management of Sanjoy Sen Mohun Bagan became the first Indian club to win a match in ACL and also reached the Round 16 of AFC Cup for the first time in the club's history in 2016. In  2019-20, Kibu Vicuña led Mohun Bagan to their second I-League title win with four matches to spare and matching Dempo's record to fastest I-League title win.

List of managers

References 

Mohun Bagan AC managers
Lists of association football managers by club in India